The Holy Trinity Church in Rothwell, West Yorkshire, England is an active Anglican parish church in the archdeaconry of Leeds and the Diocese of Leeds.

History
There has been a church on this site since 1150.  The current church was largely rebuilt to a design by C.R. Chorley and was completed in 1873.

Architectural style

Exterior

Although largely rebuilt in 1873 the church has some late medieval fabric.  It is built of Sandstone ashlar with a slate roof.  The church has a west tower built in three stages with diagonal buttresses, a clockface on its southside and belfry windows of two cusped lights. The church has a lychgate dating from 1889.

Interior

The arcades have double-chamfered arches on octagonal columns.  The nave ceiling is of late-medieval origin with moulded beams and carved bosses and a font that dates from 1662.

See also
List of places of worship in the City of Leeds

References

External links

Holy Trinity Church, Rothwell

Anglican Diocese of Leeds
Church of England church buildings in West Yorkshire
Grade II listed churches in Leeds
Anglo-Catholic church buildings in West Yorkshire
Holy Trinity Church